Reina Charbel is a Lebanese diplomat currently serving as ambassador to the Republic of Lithuania. She was accredited on 8 April 2019 by Lithuanian President Dalia Grybauskaitė. Charbel previously served as Lebanon ambassador to the Republic of Poland until 2019 when she was redeployed to Lithuania.

References 

Lebanese women ambassadors
Year of birth missing (living people)
Living people
Ambassadors of Lebanon to Lithuania
Ambassadors of Lebanon to Poland